Ida Simone Russakoff Hoos (October 9, 1912 – April 24, 2007) was an American sociologist best known as a critic of systems analysis using mathematical formulae and disregarding social factors, especially when analyzing technology and public policy.

Biography 
Born in Skowhegan, Maine, where her Jewish parents had settled as jeweler after emigrating from Russia. She graduated from Radcliffe College in 1933 and earned a master's degree from Harvard University in 1942. While in graduate school, she founded Jewish Vocational Service in Boston to help garment workers. After earning her master's, she moved to Berkeley, California, where her husband took a job teaching economics at University of California, Berkeley. She earned her Ph.D. there in 1959 with the dissertation Automation in the Office: A Social Survey of Occupational and Organizational Changes, published in book in 1961 as Automation in the Office.

Whilst a research sociologist at the University of California late 1960s she published a series of critiques of the systems approach to social policy  She criticised systems analysis for using mathematical formulae and disregarding social factors, especially when analyzing technology and public policy. She reminisced about her work's impact: "Technological advance was evident on every front. The 'dominant paradigm' embraced only the quantitative. What you could not count, did not count. The social and human aspects were systematically avoided in the rush to be 'scientific.'" 

She retired in 1982. Hoos died at Massachusetts General Hospital in Boston of pneumonia.

Publications 
Books, a selection:
 1961. Automation in the Office. Public Affairs Press.
 1967. Retraining the Work Force. University of California Press
 1972. Systems Analysis in Public Policy: A Critique. Reprinted in 1976, 1983

Articles, papers, etc. a selection: 
 1967. A Critique on the Application of Systems Analysis to Social Problems Paper Space Sciences Laboratory, Social Sciences Project, University of California
 1967. Systems Analysis in State Government. Paper Space Sciences Laboratory, Social Sciences Project, University of California
 1967. Systems Analysis, Information Handling, and the Research Function: Implications of the California Experience. Paper Space Sciences Laboratory, Social Sciences Project, University of California
 1968. A Critical Review of Systems Analysis: The California Experience. Paper Space Sciences Laboratory, Social Sciences Project, University of California
 1968. Systems analysis and the technical writer's growing responsibility. Paper Space Sciences Laboratory, Social Sciences Project 
 1969. Systems analysis in social policy: a critical review. Paper Institute of Economic Affairs

References

External links
 Ida Russakoff Hoos profile at UC Berkeley

1912 births
2007 deaths
Radcliffe College alumni
University of California, Berkeley alumni
American sociologists
Deaths from pneumonia in Massachusetts
People from Skowhegan, Maine
American women sociologists
20th-century American women
20th-century American people
21st-century American women